Maurice Charles Delage (13 November 1879 – 19 or 21 September 1961) was a French composer and pianist.

Biography
Delage was born and died in Paris. He first worked as a clerk for a maritime agency in Paris, and later as a fishmonger in Boulogne. He also served for a time in the French army, before embarking on a music career in his twenties. A student of Ravel, who proclaimed him one of the supreme French composers of his day, and member of Les Apaches, he was influenced by travels to India and Japan in 1912, when he accompanied his father on a business trip. Ravel's "La vallée des cloches" from Miroirs was dedicated to Delage.

Delage's best known piece is Quatre poèmes hindous (1912–1913). His Ragamalika (1912–1922), based on the classical music of India, is significant in that it calls for prepared piano; the score specifies that a piece of cardboard be placed under the strings of the B-flat in the second line of the bass clef to dampen the sound, imitating the sound of an Indian drum.

Selected works
Poèmes symphoniques

 Conté par la mer (1908)
 Les Bâtisseurs de ponts (1913) after Rudyard Kipling
 Overture to Ballet de l'avenir (1923)
 Contrerimes (1931), orchestration of pieces for piano
 Bateau ivre (1954) after the poem by Arthur Rimbaud
 Cinq danses symphoniques (1958)

Chamber music

 String quartet (1949)
 Suite française for string quartet (1958)

Mélodies (voice and piano)

 Trois mélodies (1909)
 Ragamalika, chant tamoul (1914)
 Trois poèmes (1922)
 Ronsard à sa muse (1924)
 Les Colombes (1924)
 La Chanson de ma mie (1924)
 Les Demoiselles d'Avignon (1924)
 Sobre las Olas (1924) on a poem by Jean Cocteau 
 Toute allégresse (1925) on a poem by Paul-Jean Toulet

Mélodies (voice with instrumental ensemble)

 Quatre poèmes hindous (1912)
 Sept haï-kaïs (1924) for soprano and chamber orchestra (to be sung without a break between songs)
  
  
  
  
  
  
  
 Deux fables de La Fontaine (1931), Le Corbeau et le Renard, and La Cigale et la Fourmi
 Trois chants de la jungle (1934) after Kipling
 In morte di un samouraï (1950) on a collection of haïkaïses and tankas by Pierre Pascal
 Trois poèmes désenchantés (1955)

Music for solo piano

 Schumann... (1918)
 Contrerimes (1927)

References

Sources
Pasler, Jann (2000). "Race, Orientalism, and Distinction in the Wake of the 'Yellow Peril'." In Western Music and Its Others: Difference, Representation, and Appropriation in Music, ed. Georgina Born and David Hesmondhalgh. Berkeley, Los Angeles, and London: University of California Press.

External links
Maurice Delage works at Classical Archives
Maurice Delage, at Maurice Ravel Frontispice, archived at the Wayback Machine on 18 September 2017 from the original. [Retrieved 17 November 2008]
Cypres bio

1879 births
1961 deaths
19th-century classical composers
19th-century French composers
19th-century French male musicians
20th-century classical composers
20th-century French composers
20th-century French male musicians
French classical composers
French male classical composers
Musicians from Paris